Jump is a 2012 Northern Irish mystery drama film set in Derry. It is based on the stage play of the same name by Lisa McGee.

Plot

The plot revolves around Greta Feeney (Burley), who intends to commit suicide on New Year's Eve, and the interplay of her friends, and her gangster father. The story is framed by a voice-over narrative by Greta.

Cast
 Nichola Burley as Greta Feeney
 Martin McCann as Pearse Kelly
 Richard Dormer as Johnny Moyes
 Ciarán McMenamin as Ross
 Charlene McKenna as Marie
 Valene Kane as Dara
 Lalor Roddy as Frank Feeney
 Packy Lee as Jack
 Kelly Gough as Lucy
 Jonathan Harden as Richie

Awards
 Best Feature at Irish Film New York 2012
 Bridging the Borders Award at the Palm Springs International Film Festival 2013

References

External links
 

2012 films
Derry (city)
Irish films based on plays
Films shot in Northern Ireland
Films set in Northern Ireland
Irish drama films
Northern Irish films
2012 drama films
2010s English-language films